Zarin-e Sofla (also Romanized as Zarīn-e Soflá; also known as Zardīn-e Soflá and Zardīn-e Pā’īn) is a village in Aliabad Rural District, in the Central District of Hashtrud County, East Azerbaijan Province, Iran. At the 2006 census, its population was 85, in 18 families.

References 

Towns and villages in Hashtrud County